The Almighty Dollar is a 1910 silent film comedy short produced by the Lubin Manufacturing Company. The film has an early appearance by Harry Myers and was released in split-reel form with The Highbinders.

A print is preserved in the Library of Congress collection.

Cast
Harry C. Myers

References

External links
 The Almighty Dollar at IMDb.com

1910 films
American silent short films
American black-and-white films
Lubin Manufacturing Company films
1910 short films
1910 comedy films
American comedy short films
Silent American comedy films
1910s American films